The Group With No Name was an American 1970s rock group, that was signed to Neil Bogart's Casablanca Records.  The group included the future actress Katey Sagal.  They released one album, Moon Over Brooklyn, and a couple of singles including "Baby Love (How Could You Leave Me)" (Casablanca 860, 1976),  with no commercial success.

Jimmy Lott and Allen Miles wrote all the music on the album, along with Katey Sagal who cowrote "Never You Mind" and "It's Me and You". In 2007, Lott released an album called "Not Enough Love". He resides with his wife and daughter in Portland, Oregon.

Bob Babbitt was a famous and successful bass player. He recorded with Funk Brothers.

Alan Schwartzberg was known as the best disco drummer in New York City. He was not part of the original group and only played drums in a recording session for their album.

The album's title song, "Moon Over Brooklyn", achieved critical acclaim and was re-recorded by Canadian superstar Anne Murray.

Discography

Albums
Moon Over Brooklyn

Singles
"Baby Love (How Could You Leave Me)" b/w "All I Need"
"Roll On Brother" b/w "Never You Mind"

Members
Bass - Bob Babbitt, Don Payne
Congas - Carlos Martin, Jimmy Maelen
Drums - Allan Schwartzberg
Vocals - Jimmy Lott, Katey Sagal, Carolyn Ray, Franny Eisenberg
Piano - Allen Miles

References

American rock music groups